Ashcroft-Cache Creek-Clinton Transit System provides transit services in the Thompson-Nicola Regional District of British Columbia. The system is served by community shuttle-type buses from Monday to Friday.

Routes

Scheduled services 

In 2013, Cache Creek decided to stop service to its town, meaning buses between Ashcroft and Clinton passed through the aforementioned town without stopping. In 2017, 100 Mile house began being served once weekly for access to medical professionals. In 2019, Cache Creek rejoined the transit system. Scheduled services previously occurred two days a week, though have now been increased to two daily services.

Paratransit
On the first three Mondays of a month, request service is offered to Kamloops, and once a month to 100 Mile House. This is on a different day than the Health Connections bus operate.

BC Transit Health Connections

All three of the towns served by the system are also served, at differing levels of service, by the BC Transit Health Connections service.

References

Transit agencies in British Columbia